is a Japanese professional footballer who currently plays as a midfielder and forward for Linköpings FC and the Japan women's national football team. She previously played for Japanese club Cerezo Osaka Sakai and NWSL club Washington Spirit.

Early life
Takarada was born in Toyama Prefecture on 27 December 1999.

Club career

Cerezo Osaka Sakai Ladies 
In 2013, Takarada joined Nadeshiko League club Cerezo Osaka Sakai. She scored 44 goals in 110 appearances for the club and helped the club gain promotion to the top flight of the Nadeshiko League in 2019. During the 2019 season, Takarada scored 2 goals in 18 appearances for Cerezo and helped the team to a fourth-place finish. She played both as a forward and as a midfielder for Cerezo.

Washington Spirit
On 1 December 2020, Takarada signed a contract with the Washington Spirit for the 2021 and 2022 seasons. Her Japanese national team teammate Kumi Yokoyama signed with the Spirit in 2019. Takarada reported to the Spirit's preseason training camp in February 2021.

Linköping FC 
On January 6, 2022, it was announced that Takarada would transfer to Damalsvenskan club Linköping FC.

International career

Youth 
In 2016, Takarada was named to the Japan U-17 national team roster for the 2016 U-17 World Cup. She played in 5 matches and scored 2 goals, helping Japan to a 2nd place finish.

In 2018, Takarada played for the Japan U-20 national team at the 2018 U-20 World Cup. She played in all 6 matches and scored 5 goals and recorded 3 assists. Takarada scored the game-winning goal for Japan in the tournament final against Spain, leading Japan to the championship. She earned the Silver Ball and Bronze Boot for her performance in the tournament. Takarada also won the 2018 Asian Young Footballer of the Year award in 2018.

Senior 
Takarada was named to the Japanese national team for the 2019 World Cup after Riko Ueki withdrew due to injury in May 2019. She served as a substitute for Japan during the World Cup, appearing in three of Japan's four games.

Career statistics

International 

Scores and results list Japan's goal tally first, score column indicates score after each Takarada goal.

Honours
Cereza Osaka Sakai

 Nadeshiko League Cup Division 2: 2017, 2019

Japan

 EAFF E-1 Football Championship: 2022

Japan U20

 FIFA U-20 Women's World Cup: 2018
 AFC U-19 Women's Championship: 2017

Japan U17

 FIFA U-17 Women's World Cup: 2016
 AFC U-16 Women's Championship: 2015

Individual
 Silver Ball, 2018 U-20 World Cup
 Bronze Boot, 2018 U-20 World Cup
 Asian Young Footballer of the Year: 2018

References

External links

Japan Football Association profile
Washington Spirit profile

1999 births
Living people
Osaka Ohtani University alumni
Association football people from Toyama Prefecture
Japanese women's footballers
Japan women's international footballers
Nadeshiko League players
Cerezo Osaka Sakai Ladies players
Women's association football forwards
2019 FIFA Women's World Cup players
Washington Spirit players
Footballers at the 2020 Summer Olympics
Olympic footballers of Japan
National Women's Soccer League players